During the 1977–78 English football season, Leicester City F.C. competed in the Football League First Division.

Season summary
In the 1977–78 season, Frank McLintock returned to Leicester, this time as a manager. However, he endured a difficult time in charge, as the Foxes went through a spell where they had one win in 26 matches and as a result finished bottom and were relegated back to the second tier after 7 years in the top flight. McLintock was sacked on 5 April and Ian MacFarlane took charge of the team for the final 5 games of Leicester's dismal season.

Final league table

Results
Leicester City's score comes first

Legend

Football League First Division

FA Cup

League Cup

Squad

References

Leicester City F.C. seasons
Leicester City